Philip Krejcarek is a Wisconsin-based fine-art photographer and artist. He taught courses in photography at Carroll University (1977-2020). There, he served as Chair of the Visual and Performing Arts Department.

He has won both regional and national awards for his work as an artist, and has published on photography. Has written three books on photography, including An Introduction to Digital Imaging (Thomson Learning, 2002), Digital Photography: A Hands on Introduction (Thomson Learning, 1996), and Photography as a Fine Art (Simon & Schuster, 1987). His influences include notable American photographers, sculptors, and installation artists, including Sandy Skoglund, Jerry Uelsmann, and Arthur Tress.

He is a recipient of a Wisconsin Arts Board grant for individual artists and regular presents at conferences such as the Society for Photographic Education. His work has been displayed in national exhibitions and has been included in collections at the Milwaukee Art Museum, The Denver Art Museum, Wustum Museum of Fine Arts, and the Haggerty Museum of Art. He has been showcased by the ACLU as an artist whose work has sparked debates about freedom of expression, In 2013, he received a prize for his photograph, “On the Scuppernong Trail,” in the Milwaukee Area Teachers of Art spring exhibition.

Krejcarek received his M.F.A. degree in sculpture, and his work was featured in the Lynden Sculpture Garden.  with blue ladder sculptures. 

He is the author of plays, short stories, articles, and a novel.

Works
 Digital Photography: A Hands-On Introduction, Van Nostrand Reinhold, 1996, 
 An Introduction to Digital Imaging with Photoshop 7, 2002, Delmar Cengage Learning 
 Photography as Fine Art, Simon & Schuster Press, 1987, 
 SYBIL, a novel published on Amazon, 2018, 
 IMPURE THOUGHTS, WORDS, AND DEEDS: A PLAY ABOUT SEXUALITY, a play published on Amazon, 2018, 
 HALF-LIFE STORIES: a collection of short stories and plays, published on Amazon, 2018, 
 IT MIGHT HAVE HAPPENED THIS WAY: a collection of plays and articles, published on Amazon, 2021, 
 LAST CHANCE: a novel, published on Amazon,2021, 
 STILL: a collection of plays and articles, published on Amazon, 2022 
 UNTIL: a collection of plays and articles, published on Amazon, 2022 
 CLICK:  a collection of plays and articles, published on Amazon, 2022 
 DEAD: a collection of plays and articles, published on Amazon, 2023 
 SYBIL'S STORY: a retelling of the SYBIL novel, published on Amazon, 2023 
 NORMAL: a collection of plays and articles, published on Amazon, 2023

References

External links
 .  
 Author site on Amazon: https://www.amazon.com/stores/author/B001KI3EV8
 Author site on MagCloud: https://www.magcloud.com/browse/search?q=krejcarek. Artist photography books on MagCloud:
   The Magdalene https://www.magcloud.com/browse/issue/1499651
   Rubber Ducky  https://www.magcloud.com/browse/issue/1965531
   Exhibited Close To  https://www.magcloud.com/browse/issue/1396628
   Goddess of the Night https://www.magcloud.com/browse/issue/683393
   Second Coming https://www.magcloud.com/browse/issue/2286333
   Blue Ladders  https://www.magcloud.com/browse/issue/1217868
   Muse https://www.magcloud.com/browse/issue/1740957
   Chess https://www.magcloud.com/browse/issue/2366382
   Dead  https://www.magcloud.com/browse/issue/2403866
   Plays  https://www.magcloud.com/browse/issue/1954894
   Books With Only Covers  https://www.magcloud.com/browse/issue/1989408
   Calatrava  https://www.magcloud.com/browse/issue/1617781
   Exhibited At  https://www.magcloud.com/browse/issue/1636031
   Of Myhs and Martinis  https://www.magcloud.com/browse/issue/687132
   What Ansel Saw  https://www.magcloud.com/browse/issue/1982556
   Kodak Moment https://www.magcloud.com/browse/issue/1991293
   Caution Signs https://www.magcloud.com/browse/issue/1617784
 Blurb books: https://www.blurb.com/my/dashboard
 Holf-Life Stories: https://halflifestories.weebly.com/short-stories.html
 YouTube interview with ACLU of Wisconsin: https://www.youtube.com/watch?v=q4x6J4YPT2M

Early Years

Philip Krejcarek wa born on August 13, 1946, in Oshkosh, Wisconsin.
He graduated from Nathan Hale High School, 
West Allis, Wisconsin in 1964. He received a B.S. in Art degree from The University of Wisconsin - Oshkosh in 1968. He earned an M.F.A. degree in sculpture form the University of Wisconsin - Milwaukee in 1973.
He taught art at Marquette University High School from 1968-1977, There he introduced courses in ceramics, photography and architecture.

Living people
Carroll University faculty
Artists from Wisconsin
Writers from Wisconsin
Fine art photographers
Year of birth missing (living people)